The Michigan Festival of Sacred Music (MFSM) is a biennial music festival in southwest Michigan that shares the music of diverse religious traditions. The festival occurs during the second weekend in November in odd-numbered years. Events include public concerts and presentations, lectures, and related workshops.

Mission 
The mission of the Michigan Festival of Sacred Music is to present high quality events which represent different religious traditions, promoting mutual respect and understanding through sharing the music treasured by these traditions, and promoting community interaction.

History 
In 1998 the Congregation of the First Baptist Church of Kalamazoo, Michigan voted to explore the desirability and feasibility of introducing a biennial festival of sacred music into the Kalamazoo Area. With support from the Irving S. Gilmore and Kalamazoo Community Foundations and input from Kalamazoo-area religious and community leaders, the project got underway in January 1999. An opinion survey to determine its desirability concluded that such a festival is both desirable and feasible. In January 2000 and area-wide representative group met to prepare for its introduction and decided to call it the Michigan Festival of Sacred Music. A board of directors was formed with the goal of making the festival a reality in November 2001.

The first full MFSM festival in 2001 was an overwhelming success, and the Michigan Festival of Sacred Music, now an independent organization, has continued planning and presenting the biennial festivals. It is supported by numerous grants and individual contributions, showing the strong support the festival's goals continue to have. It continues to be led by a Board and Advisory Council made up of community leaders and representatives of many different faiths. In 2004, the MFSM presented its first off-season event, which proved to be a great success. The MFSM plans to continue the presentation of single off-season events.

In 2007, the MFSM took over co-sponsorship of the Sing-Along Messiah, shared with First Congregational Church.  This event, which drew over 500 attendees (including about 40 homeless people) in 2007, generally occurs annually on the Sunday following Thanksgiving.  In 2007, the MFSM assumed the co-sponsorship role which had previously been taken by the Kalamazoo Bach Festival Society.

As attendance increases with each MFSM, the response from the public and the artists themselves shows that the MFSM provides a much-needed channel for mutual understanding of diverse religious traditions and cultures.  The first festival, occurring as it did soon after the 2001 terrorist attacks, had a powerful healing quality.  As our community continues to try to make sense of events unfolding on the world stage, we find the subsequent festivals to be as meaningful as the first.  The high quality of the performing artists and programming makes the festivals valuable aesthetic experiences, as well.

External links 
Michigan Festival of Sacred Music

References 

Music festivals in Michigan
Tourist attractions in Kalamazoo County, Michigan
Religious music festivals